The British Journal of Ophthalmology is a peer-reviewed medical journal covering all aspects of ophthalmology. The journal was established in 1917 by the amalgamation of the Royal London (Moorfields) Ophthalmic Hospital Reports with the Ophthalmoscope and the Ophthalmic Record. The journal was edited for several years by Stewart Duke-Elder. Currently, Keith Barton, James Chodosh, and Jost Jonasand are editors-in-chief.

Abstracting and indexing
The journal is abstracted and indexed in Index Medicus, PubMed, Current Contents, Excerpta Medica, and Scopus. According to the Journal Citation Reports, the journal has a 2021 impact factor of 5.907.

References

External links

Ophthalmology journals
Monthly journals
BMJ Group academic journals
Publications established in 1917
English-language journals